Tikhonikha is a rural locality (a village) in Medvedevskoye Rural Settlement, Totemsky  District, Vologda Oblast, Russia. The population was 2 as of 2002.

Geography 
Tikhonikha is located 71 km east of Totma (the district's administrative centre) by road. Kolupaikha is the nearest rural locality.

References 

Rural localities in Tarnogsky District